The judo competition at the 2018 Central American and Caribbean Games was held in Barranquilla, Colombia from 30 July to 2 August at the Coliseo Colegio Marymount.

Medal summary

Men's events

Women's events

Medal table

References

External links
Central American and Caribbean Games – Judo

2018 Central American and Caribbean Games events
Central American and Caribbean Games
2018